
Gmina Lututów is a rural gmina (administrative district) in Wieruszów County, Łódź Voivodeship, in central Poland.

Villages
Gmina Lututów contains the villages and settlements of Augustynów, Bielawy, Brzozowiec, Chojny, Dębina, Dobrosław, Dobrosław-Kolonia, Dymki, Hipolity, Huta, Janusz, Jeżopole, Józefina, Kijanice, Kłoniczki, Kluski, Knapy, Kopaniny, Kornelin, Kozub, Łęki Duże, Łęki Małe, Lututów, Niemojew, Ostrycharze, Piaski, Piaski-Młynek, Popielina, Popielina-Towarzystwo, Świątkowice, Swoboda, Walknówek, Wiry, Żmuda and Zygmuntów.

Neighbouring gminas
Gmina Lututów is bordered by the gminas of Biała, Czarnożyły, Galewice, Klonowa, Ostrówek, Sokolniki and Złoczew.

References
 Polish official population figures 2006

Lututow
Wieruszów County